Li Po-ting (born 30 August 1936) is a Taiwanese sprinter. He competed in the men's 400 metres at the 1960 Summer Olympics.

References

1936 births
Living people
Athletes (track and field) at the 1960 Summer Olympics
Taiwanese male sprinters
Taiwanese male hurdlers
Olympic athletes of Taiwan
Place of birth missing (living people)